Bailey Olter (27 March 1932, Mwoakilloa, Pohnpei, Federated States of Micronesia – 16 February 1999) was a Micronesian political figure. He was elected to the Senate of Micronesian Congress from Ponape district. He served as Vice President of the Federated States of Micronesia from 1983 to 1987, and as the third president of the Federated States of Micronesia from 1991 to 1996. He suffered a stroke in July 1996 ending his capacity to carry out his office; his Vice President Jacob Nena served the last year of his term.

References

Official biography
Third FSM president Bailey Olter dies.

1932 births
1999 deaths
People from Pohnpei State
Presidents of the Federated States of Micronesia
Vice presidents of the Federated States of Micronesia
University of Hawaiʻi alumni
Members of the Congress of the Trust Territory of the Pacific Islands
Members of the Congress of the Federated States of Micronesia